Ender Thomas is a Venezuelan singer-songwriter. He was a featured vocalist during the 2009 tour for Yanni Voices produced by Disney Pearl Imprint. His vocal range is tenor.

Ender was born in Puerto Cabello, Venezuela. Prior to his work with  Greek musician Yanni, he was the frontman for a salsa band in his home country. For the Voices project, he was the last of the four vocalists selected. Yanni commented "It took us a year and a half to find Ender. We were looking for a Latino, fiery, specific kind of voice. And that took us a long time to find."

Discography

Albums
Yanni Voices - featured vocalist
Yanni Presents Ender Thomas

Singles
 Ritual de Amor
 Bajo El Cielo De Noviembre
 Susurros En la Oscuridad
 Mi Todo Eres Tú
 Sin Temor De Vivir
 Sirena
 Quedate Conmigo
 Por Llegar A Tí
 India
 Este Amor
 Como Debe Ser
 Más Allá

Singles
 "Me fascinas" with A.B. Quintanilla Released July, 2010
 "El Principe De La Paz" Released December, 2010
 "O Principe Da Paz" Released December, 2010
 "The Prince Of Peace" Released December, 2010
 "Puerto Cabello Te Quiero" Released March, 2011
 "Desejo" Released April, 2011
 "Vino" Released May, 2012
 "Soy Venezuela" Released April, 2013

References

External links
 
 
 
 

21st-century Venezuelan male singers
Living people
Venezuelan songwriters
Male songwriters
1977 births